Juca may refer to the following

Juca (name), many people with the given name or surname
Jucá River, river in Brazil
Estádio Juca Ribeiro, stadium in Brazil
"I-Juca-Pirama", Brazilian poem

See also